Waitress is a 2007 American comedy-drama film written and directed by Adrienne Shelly, starring Keri Russell as a young woman trapped in a small town and an abusive marriage, who faces an unwanted pregnancy while working as a waitress. The film debuted at the 2007 Sundance Film Festival and went into limited theatrical release in the US on May 2, 2007. It is the basis for the Tony-nominated musical Waitress. Shelly's supporting role is her final film appearance before her death.

Plot
Jenna Hunterson is a waitress living in the American South, trapped in an unhappy marriage with her controlling and abusive husband, Earl. She works in Joe's Pie Diner, where her job includes creating inventive pies with unusual titles inspired by her life, such as the "Bad Baby Pie" she invents after her unintended pregnancy is confirmed. Jenna longs to run away from her dismal marriage and is slowly accumulating money to do so. She pins her hopes for escape on a pie contest in a nearby town, which offers a $25,000 grand prize, but her husband won't let her go. 

Jenna's only friends are her co-workers, Becky and Dawn, and Joe, the curmudgeonly owner of the diner and several other local businesses, who is a regular customer of Jenna's at the diner and encourages her to begin a new life elsewhere. 

Jenna's life changes after she meets her new obstetrician, Jim Pomatter. He has moved to the small town to accommodate his wife, who is completing her residency at the local hospital, and is filling in for the woman who has been Jenna's doctor since childhood. The two are attracted to each other, and over the course of several prenatal appointments the attraction grows. After Dr. Pomatter invites her into the office under a quickly exposed pretext, she impulsively initiates a passionate affair.

Prompted by her co-workers' gift of a baby journal, Jenna begins to keep a diary, ostensibly as letters to her unborn child, revealing her inner thoughts and plans.
Upon learning she is pregnant, Earl demands Jenna promise never to love the baby more than him. Jenna also bonds unexpectedly with her gruff bossy manager, Cal the cook, when she fearfully informs him of her pregnancy, only to discover he already knows and always planned to keep her employed. 

At Dawn's wedding at the diner, Earl interrupts the celebration and demands Jenna leave at once. Earl drives Jenna home and confronts her, having found Jenna's multiple stashes of cash throughout the house. Reluctantly, Jenna tells Earl that the money was for the baby, which forces her to spend the money to conceal the true purpose of the funds. In despair, she flees to Dr. Pomatter, who provides much-needed comfort; as they fantasize about running away together, Jenna's water breaks.

At the hospital, Jenna discovers Joe is also a patient undergoing an elective procedure; he hands her an envelope with instructions not to open it until after the baby is born. Much to her dismay, she is also greeted warmly by Dr. Pomatter's wife, who is rounding with other residents. Jenna then begs Dr. Pomatter to administer as many drugs as possible so she won't feel a thing.

Jenna soon gives birth to a baby girl. When she holds and sees her newborn for the first time, Jenna's profound ambivalence melts into a full-blown bond with her daughter, whom she names Lulu. Earl, clearly disappointed that it's a girl, reminds Jenna of her coerced promise not to love the baby more than she does him. She bluntly tells him that she hasn't loved him in years, will no longer put up with his possessiveness and abuse, and will not let Lulu grow up with his mistreating her, and wants a divorce. Enraged, Earl attempts to assault Jenna, but is escorted out of the hospital by security staff.

Later, as Jenna prepares to leave the hospital, due to Earl refusing to pay her medical bills as retaliation for being kicked out, Becky and Dawn inform her Joe collapsed into a coma during his procedure. Jenna then remembers the envelope Joe brought her before the birth. In the envelope she finds a handmade card with a sketch of her, inscribed "To my only friend, start fresh", along with a check for $270,450.

While leaving the hospital, Dr. Pomatter requests a word with her in private, inquiring about their future. Grateful for his profound kindness, she nonetheless promptly breaks it off, informing him of the enormous trust she sensed from his wife. She then hands him a chocolate Moon Pie and asks her friends to wheel her out.

In an epilogue, Earl is not shown, Jenna is shown winning the pie contest, as well as turning the diner into a successful chain named "Lulu's Pies", and she and Lulu walk home happily.

Cast

 Keri Russell as Jenna Hunterson
 Nathan Fillion as Dr. Jim Pomatter
 Cheryl Hines as Becky
 Adrienne Shelly as Dawn
 Eddie Jemison as Ogie Anhorn
 Jeremy Sisto as Earl Hunterson
 Andy Griffith as Joe
 Lew Temple as Cal
 Darby Stanchfield as Francine Pomatter
 Lauri Johnson as Nurse Norma
 Sarah Hunley as Dr. Lily Mueller
 Nora Paradiso as Ethel
 Holgie Forrester as Dawn's mother
 Sophie Ostroy as Lulu

Release

The film was accepted into the 2007 Sundance Film Festival, though its premiere was "bittersweet" because writer/director Adrienne Shelly, who also played Dawn in the film, was murdered on November 1, 2006, less than three months before its debut and just before she was about to learn the film had been accepted into the festival. Its success there led Fox Searchlight Pictures to acquire the distribution rights for $4–5 million. It opened the U.S. Comedy Arts Festival.

Reception
The film received mostly positive reviews, with a 89% "Fresh" rating among the 174 critic reviews tracked by Rotten Tomatoes, with an average rating of 7.30/10. The consensus reads: "Sweet, smart, and quirky, Waitress hits the right, bittersweet notes through this romantic comedy through its witty script and a superb performance by Keri Russell". The film also made the site's list of Top 100 films for 2007. It got rated 75 out of 100 at Metacritic. Waitress was called a  "good-hearted, well-made comedy" brimming with "quality star wattage".

Mick LaSalle called it a "great American film" that transcends its "air of whimsicality and its emphasis on small-town characters and humble locations".

Keri Russell's performance in the film partly inspired casting director Andrea Romano to cast her as the voice of Wonder Woman in the 2009 animated film Wonder Woman.

Awards and nominations

Stage adaptation

A stage musical was written based on the film. The musical opened at the American Repertory Theater, Cambridge, Massachusetts, running from August 2 to September 27, 2015. The music and lyrics are written by Sara Bareilles, with the book by Jessie Nelson. Diane Paulus directs, with choreography by Chase Brock, sets by Scott Pask, costumes by Suttirat Larlarb and lighting by Ken Posner. The original Broadway cast featured Jessie Mueller as Jenna, Drew Gehling as Dr. Pomatter, Dakin Matthews as Joe, Keala Settle as Becky, Kimiko Glenn as Dawn, Eric Anderson as Cal, Christopher Fitzgerald as Ogie and Nick Cordero as Earl.

The musical opened on Broadway at the Brooks Atkinson Theatre, previews started on March 25, 2016, and the show officially opened on April 24. The cast featured Mueller, Gehling, Matthews, Settle, and Anderson all returning from the A.R.T production, as well as Kimiko Glenn as Dawn, Christopher Fitzgerald as Ogie, and Nick Cordero as Earl.

References

External links

 
 
 
 
 
 Trailer at Apple.com

2007 films
2000s pregnancy films
American romantic comedy-drama films
2007 romantic comedy-drama films
Fox Searchlight Pictures films
American independent films
Films about domestic violence
American pregnancy films
Cooking films
Films directed by Adrienne Shelly
2007 independent films
2000s English-language films
2000s American films